¡Sorpresa! ("Surprise!" in Spanish) is an American Spanish-language children's television channel.

The channel is currently available for the United States and Puerto Rico on Charter Spectrum, Claro Puerto Rico,  Cox Communications, Frontier Communications, Grande Communications, Liberty Puerto Rico, RCN, Suddenlink, and member systems of the National Cable TV Cooperative. ¡Sorpresa! is also available through third-party mobile TV and broadband platforms, including VEMOX, Brightcove and MobiTV. The channel was also formerly available through Akimbo.

History
In August 2009, Olympusat Inc. bought the channel ¡Sorpresa! from its previous owner, Firestone/Juniper Content Corp.

On March 1, 2019, Verizon Fios removed the channel from its lineup.

Programming

Current
The Adventures of Annie and Ben
Altair in Starland
The Beet Party
Boom & Reds
Brewster the Rooster
El Mundo Animal de Max Rodríguez
El Pequeño Meňique
The Gloops
Glumpers
Hero: 108
Hullabalooba
Kemy
Lucky Fred
The Magical Toothfairies
Mouk (2017–present)
Nutri Ventures – The Quest for the 7 Kingdoms
OTO and Music
Pet Pals
Pip Ahoy!
Pispas
Rat-A-Tat
Red Beard
Slash
Telmo and Tula: Little Cooks
ToddWorld (2003–present)
Toopy and Binoo
Van Dogh
Wakkaville
Yu-Gi-Oh! Zexal

Former

References

External links
 ¡Sorpresa! TV's Official site

Spanish-language television networks in the United States
Television channels and stations established in 2003
Children's television networks in the United States